The Riyad Hijab government was the fourth Syrian government formed during the presidency of Bashar al-Assad. It was formed on 23 June 2012 and dissolved on 6 August 2012 after Prime Minister Riyad Farid Hijab defected. He was later succeeded by Wael Nader al-Halqi.

See also
Cabinet of Syria
Government ministries of Syria
List of prime ministers of Syria
Ministry of Defense (Syria)
List of foreign ministers of Syria

References 

2012 establishments in Syria
Bashar al-Assad
Governments of Syria
Government ministers of Syria
Lists of political office-holders in Syria
2012 disestablishments in Syria
Cabinets established in 2012
Cabinets disestablished in 2012